The  Washington Redskins season was the franchise's 49th season in the National Football League (NFL) and their 43rd in Washington, D.C. They failed to improve on their 10–6 record from 1979, dropping to 6–10, their only double-digit losing season between 1964 and 1992.  This was Jack Pardee's last season as head coach.

Offseason

NFL draft

Personnel

Staff

Roster

Regular season

Schedule

Season summary

Week 1 vs Cowboys

Week 2 at Giants

Standings

References

External links
 1980 Washington Redskins at Pro-Football-Reference.com

Washington
Washington Redskins seasons
Wash